is a Japanese voice actress who is affiliated with Theater Echo.

Filmography

Anime television series
Aim for the Ace! (Kyoko Otowa)
Ashita no Nadja (Johanna)
Combat Mecha Xabungle (Greta Karas)
Fullmetal Alchemist (Lebi)
Hiatari Ryōkō! (Chigusa Mizusawa)
La Seine no Hoshi (Princess Marie Therese)
Maison Ikkoku (Kasumi)
Monster (Lunge's Wife)
Otome Yōkai Zakuro (Kushimatsu)
Paranoia Agent (Misae Ikari)
Pygmalio (Medusa)
Super Doll★Licca-chan (Nanae Kayama)
Tekkaman: The Space Knight (Mūtan)
Touch (Haruko Uesugi)
Urusei Yatsura (Ran (2nd voice))
Yu-Gi-Oh! Duel Monsters GX (Tania)

Original video animations
Giant Robo: The Animation (Youshi)
Urusei Yatsura works (Ran)
Virgin Fleet (Suzukure Mibuno)

Anime films
Farewell to Space Battleship Yamato (Sarbera)
Touch works (Haruko Uesugi)
Urusei Yatsura works (Ran)
Candy Candy the Movie works (Mrs. Leagan)

Tokusatsu
Saru No Gundan (Bop)
Bouken Rockbat (Mimi-chan)
Daitetsujin 17 (Tommy Boys)

Game
Eternal Arcadia (Teodora)
Mobile Suit Gundam: Zeonic Front (Sophie Franc)

Dubbing roles

Live-action
24 (Sherry Palmer (Penny Johnson Jerald))
Addams Family Values (Debbie Jellinsky (Joan Cusack))
American Horror Story: Hotel (Iris (Kathy Bates))
The Americans (Claudia (Margo Martindale))
Bionic Woman (Ruth Truewell (Molly Price))
The Burning (1985 Fuji TV edition) (Diane (Kevi Kendall))
Cat People (2003 DVD edition) (Female (Ruby Dee))
Coneheads (Prymaat Conehead / Mary Margaret Rowney (Jane Curtin))
Cory in the House (Ms. Vanderslyce (Amy Tolsky))
The Crow (1997 TV Tokyo edition) (Darla Mohr (Anna Thomson))
Date Movie (Roz Fockyerdoder (Jennifer Coolidge))
Death on the Nile (Marie Van Schuyler (Jennifer Saunders))
Desperate Housewives (Martha Huber (Christine Estabrook))
Dharma & Greg (Abby O'Neil (Mimi Kennedy))
Die Hard with a Vengeance (Connie Kowalski (Colleen Camp))
Dinosaurs (Fran Sinclair)
Downton Abbey (Maud, Lady Bagshaw (Imelda Staunton))
Episodes (Beverly Lincoln (Tamsin Greig))
ER (Kerry Weaver (Laura Innes))
Fires (Caris Mazzeo (Noni Hazlehurst))
The Fisher King (Anne Napolitano (Mercedes Ruehl))
The Forgotten (Anne Pope (Alfre Woodard))
Frasier (Roz Doyle (Peri Gilpin))
Ghost (Oda Mae Brown (Whoopi Goldberg))
The Good Wife (Diane Lockhart (Christine Baranski))
The Good Fight (Diane Lockhart (Christine Baranski))
Halloween II (1988 NTV edition) (Nurse Karen Bailey (Pamela Susan Shoop))
Harry Potter and the Order of the Phoenix (Dolores Umbridge (Imelda Staunton))
Harry Potter and the Deathly Hallows – Part 1 (Dolores Umbridge (Imelda Staunton))
High School Musical (Ms. Darbus (Alyson Reed))
The Highwaymen (Miriam "Ma" Ferguson (Kathy Bates))
Hitchcock (Alma Reville (Helen Mirren))
The Hollars (Sally Hollar (Margo Martindale))
How the Grinch Stole Christmas (Betty Lou Who (Molly Shannon))
Hudson Hawk (Minerva Mayflower (Sandra Bernhard))
Igby Goes Down (Mimi Slocumb (Susan Sarandon))
In & Out (Emily Montgomery (Joan Cusack))
Kindergarten Cop (Jillian (Cathy Moriarty))
Kindergarten Cop (1995 TV Asahi edition) (Detective Phoebe O'Hara (Pamela Reed))
Last Action Hero (Irene Madigan (Mercedes Ruehl))
Meet the Fockers (Roz Focker (Barbra Streisand))
Little Fockers (Roz Focker (Barbra Streisand))
Little Voice (Mari Hoff (Brenda Blethyn))
MacGyver (Matilda "Matty" Webber (Meredith Eaton))
Made in America (Sarah Mathews (Whoopi Goldberg))
The Man Who Invented Christmas (Elizabeth Dickens (Ger Ryan))
Melrose Place (Jo Reynolds (Daphne Zuniga))
Milk Money (V (Melanie Griffith))
Mission: Impossible (Shannon Reed (Jane Badler))
Monkeybone (Death (Whoopi Goldberg))
Mrs. America (Bella Abzug (Margo Martindale))
The Nude Bomb (1988 TV Asahi edition) (Agent 34 (Sylvia Kristel))
Out of Sight (Karen Sisco (Jennifer Lopez))
The Outsider (Jeannie Anderson (Mare Winningham))
The Pale Horse (Sybil Stamfordis (Kathy Kiera Clarke))
Panic Room (Lydia Lynch (Ann Magnuson))
The Parent Trap (Chessy (Lisa Ann Walter))
Parental Guidance (Diane Decker (Bette Midler))
Piranha (Maggie McKeown (Heather Menzies))
Powder (Jessie Caldwell (Mary Steenburgen))
The Purple Rose of Cairo (Rita (Deborah Rush))
Rambo: Last Blood (Maria Beltran (Adriana Barraza))
Revolutionary Road (Helen Givings (Kathy Bates))
Richard Jewell (Barbara "Bobi" Jewell (Kathy Bates))
RoboCop 3 (Anne Lewis (Nancy Allen))
Rome (Atia of the Julii (Polly Walker))
Romy and Michele's High School Reunion (Heather Mooney (Janeane Garofalo))
Sledge Hammer! (Detective Dori Doreau (Anne-Marie Martin))
Sleepless in Seattle (Victoria (Barbara Garrick))
Stage Mother (Maybelline Metcalf (Jacki Weaver))
Star Trek: Deep Space Nine (Kira Nerys (Nana Visitor))
The Stepford Wives (Bobbie Markowitz (Bette Midler))
Stuck on You (Cher)
Twilight (Lieutenant Verna Hollander (Stockard Channing))
Veronica's Closet (Olive Massery (Kathy Najimy))
Werewolf by Night (Verussa Bloodstone (Harriet Sansom Harris))
West Side Story (1979 TBS edition) (Velma (Carole D'Andrea))
Working Girl (Cynthia (Joan Cusack))
It's a Very Merry Muppet Christmas Movie (The Boss (Whoopi Goldberg))

Animation
Aaahh!!! Real Monsters (Oblina)
Arthur Christmas (Margaret Claus)
Bambi (Aunt Ena)
Chicken Run (Bunty)
Coraline (April Spink)
Dumbo (Prissy, 1983 version)
Goof Troop (Peg Pete)
Inside Out (Dream Director)
Meet the Robinsons (Lucille Krunklehorn)
Strange World (Ro)
Titan A.E. (Stith)
The Transformers (Elita One, Wheelie, Marissa Faireborn)

References

External links

Living people
1952 births
People from Tokyo
Japanese voice actresses